Quantum decoherence is the loss of quantum coherence, the process in which a system's behaviour changes from that which can be explained by quantum mechanics to that which can be explained by classical mechanics. In quantum mechanics, particles such as electrons are described by a wave function, a mathematical representation of the quantum state of a system; a probabilistic interpretation of the wave function is used to explain various quantum effects. As long as there exists a definite phase relation between different states, the system is said to be coherent. A definite phase relationship is necessary to perform quantum computing on quantum information encoded in quantum states. Coherence is preserved under the laws of quantum physics.

If a quantum system were perfectly isolated, it would maintain coherence indefinitely, but it would be impossible to manipulate or investigate it. If it is not perfectly isolated, for example during a measurement, coherence is shared with the environment and appears to be lost with time; a process called quantum decoherence. As a result of this process, quantum behavior is apparently lost, just as energy appears to be lost by friction in classical mechanics.

Decoherence was first introduced in 1970 by the German physicist H. Dieter Zeh and has been a subject of active research since the 1980s. Decoherence has been developed into a complete framework, but there is controversy as to whether it solves the measurement problem, as the founders of decoherence theory admit in their seminal papers.

Decoherence can be viewed as the loss of information from a system into the environment (often modeled as a heat bath), since every system is loosely coupled with the energetic state of its surroundings. Viewed in isolation, the system's dynamics are non-unitary (although the combined system plus environment evolves in a unitary fashion). Thus the dynamics of the system alone are irreversible. As with any coupling, entanglements are generated between the system and environment.  These have the effect of sharing quantum information with—or transferring it to—the surroundings.

Decoherence has been used to understand the possibility of the collapse of the wave function in quantum mechanics. Decoherence does not generate actual wave-function collapse. It only provides a framework for apparent wave-function collapse, as the quantum nature of the system "leaks" into the environment. That is, components of the wave function are decoupled from a coherent system and acquire phases from their immediate surroundings. A total superposition of the global or universal wavefunction still exists (and remains coherent at the global level), but its ultimate fate remains an interpretational issue. 

With respect to the measurement problem, decoherence provides an explanation for the transition of the system to a mixture of states that seem to correspond to those states observers perceive. Moreover, observation indicates that this mixture looks like a proper quantum ensemble in a measurement situation, as the measurements lead to the "realization" of precisely one state in the "ensemble".

Decoherence represents a challenge for the practical realization of quantum computers, since such machines are expected to rely heavily on the undisturbed evolution of quantum coherences. Simply put, they require that the coherence of states be preserved and that decoherence be managed, in order to actually perform quantum computation. The preservation of coherence, and mitigation of decoherence effects, are thus related to the concept of quantum error correction.

Mechanisms
To examine how decoherence operates, an "intuitive" model is presented below. The model requires some familiarity with quantum theory basics. Analogies are made between visualizable classical phase spaces and Hilbert spaces. A more rigorous derivation in Dirac notation shows how decoherence destroys interference effects and the "quantum nature" of systems. Next, the density matrix approach is presented for perspective.

Phase-space picture
An N-particle system can be represented in non-relativistic quantum mechanics by a wave function , where each xi is a point in 3-dimensional space.  This has analogies with the classical phase space. A classical phase space contains a real-valued function in 6N dimensions (each particle contributes 3 spatial coordinates and 3 momenta). In this case a "quantum" phase space, on the other hand, involves a complex-valued function on a 3N-dimensional space. The position and momenta are represented by operators that do not commute, and  lives in the mathematical structure of a Hilbert space. Aside from these differences, however, the rough analogy holds.

Different previously isolated, non-interacting systems occupy different phase spaces. Alternatively we can say that they occupy different lower-dimensional subspaces in the phase space of the joint system. The effective dimensionality of a system's phase space is the number of degrees of freedom present, which—in non-relativistic models—is 6 times the number of a system's free particles. For a macroscopic system this will be a very large dimensionality. When two systems (and the environment would be a system) start to interact, though, their associated state vectors are no longer constrained to the subspaces. Instead the combined state vector time-evolves a path through the "larger volume", whose dimensionality is the sum of the dimensions of the two subspaces. The extent to which two vectors interfere with each other is a measure of how "close" they are to each other (formally, their overlap or Hilbert space multiplies together) in the phase space.  When a system couples to an external environment, the dimensionality of, and hence "volume" available to, the joint state vector increases enormously. Each environmental degree of freedom contributes an extra dimension.

The original system's wave function can be expanded in many different ways as a sum of elements in a quantum superposition. Each expansion corresponds to a projection of the wave vector onto a basis. The basis can be chosen at will. Choosing an expansion where the resulting basis elements interact with the environment in an element-specific way, such elements will—with overwhelming probability—be rapidly separated from each other by their natural unitary time evolution along their own independent paths. After a very short interaction, there is almost no chance of further interference. The process is effectively irreversible. The different elements effectively become "lost" from each other in the expanded phase space created by coupling with the environment. In phase space, this decoupling is monitored through the Wigner quasi-probability distribution. The original elements are said to have decohered. The environment has effectively selected out those expansions or decompositions of the original state vector that decohere (or lose phase coherence) with each other. This is called "environmentally-induced superselection", or einselection. The decohered elements of the system no longer exhibit quantum interference between each other, as in a double-slit experiment. Any elements that decohere from each other via environmental interactions are said to be quantum-entangled with the environment. The converse is not true: not all entangled states are decohered from each other.

Any measuring device or apparatus acts as an environment, since at some stage along the measuring chain, it has to be large enough to be read by humans. It must possess a very large number of hidden degrees of freedom. In effect, the interactions may be considered to be quantum measurements. As a result of an interaction, the wave functions of the system and the measuring device become entangled with each other. Decoherence happens when different portions of the system's wave function become entangled in different ways with the measuring device. For two einselected elements of the entangled system's state to interfere, both the original system and the measuring in both elements device must significantly overlap, in the scalar product sense. If the measuring device has many degrees of freedom, it is very unlikely for this to happen.

As a consequence, the system behaves as a classical statistical ensemble of the different elements rather than as a single coherent quantum superposition of them. From the perspective of each ensemble member's measuring device, the system appears to have irreversibly collapsed onto a state with a precise value for the measured attributes, relative to that element. This provides one explanation of how the Born rule coefficients effectively act as probabilities as per the measurement postulate constituting a solution to the quantum measurement problem.

Dirac notation
Using Dirac notation, let the system initially be in the state

 

where the s form an einselected basis (environmentally induced selected eigenbasis), and let the environment initially be in the state . The vector basis of the combination of the system and the environment consists of the tensor products of the basis vectors of the two subsystems. Thus, before any interaction between the two subsystems, the joint state can be written as

 

where  is shorthand for the tensor product . There are two extremes in the way the system can interact with its environment: either (1) the system loses its distinct identity and merges with the environment (e.g. photons in a cold, dark cavity get converted into molecular excitations within the cavity walls), or (2) the system is not disturbed at all, even though the environment is disturbed (e.g. the idealized non-disturbing measurement). In general, an interaction is a mixture of these two extremes that we examine.

System absorbed by environment
If the environment absorbs the system, each element of the total system's basis interacts with the environment such that

  evolves into 

and so

  evolves into 

The unitarity of time evolution demands that the total state basis remains orthonormal, i.e. the scalar or inner products of the basis vectors must vanish, since :

 

This orthonormality of the environment states is the defining characteristic required for einselection.

System not disturbed by environment
In an idealized measurement, the system disturbs the environment, but is itself undisturbed by the environment. In this case, each element of the basis interacts with the environment such that

  evolves into the product 

and so

  evolves into 

In this case, unitarity demands that

 

where  was used. Additionally, decoherence requires, by virtue of the large number of hidden degrees of freedom in the environment, that

 

As before, this is the defining characteristic for decoherence to become einselection. The approximation becomes more exact as the number of environmental degrees of freedom affected increases.

This would correspond to the system basis being degenerate with respect to the environmentally defined measurement observable. For a complex environmental interaction (which would be expected for a typical macroscale interaction) a non-einselected basis would be hard to define.

Loss of interference and the transition from quantum to classical probabilities
The utility of decoherence lies in its application to the analysis of probabilities, before and after environmental interaction, and in particular to the vanishing of quantum interference terms after decoherence has occurred.

The above expansion of the transition probability has terms that involve ; these can be thought of as representing interference between the different basis elements or quantum alternatives. This is a purely quantum effect and represents the non-additivity of the probabilities of quantum alternatives.

 

The internal summation vanishes when we apply the decoherence/einselection condition , and the formula simplifies to

 

If we compare this with the formula we derived before the environment introduced decoherence, we can see that the effect of decoherence has been to move the summation sign  from inside of the modulus sign to outside. As a result, all the cross- or quantum interference-terms

 

have vanished from the transition-probability calculation.  The decoherence has irreversibly converted quantum behaviour (additive probability amplitudes) to classical behaviour (additive probabilities).

In terms of density matrices, the loss of interference effects corresponds to the diagonalization of the "environmentally traced-over" density matrix.

Density-matrix approach 
The effect of decoherence on density matrices is essentially the decay or rapid vanishing of the off-diagonal elements of the partial trace of the joint system's density matrix, i.e. the trace, with respect to any environmental basis, of the density matrix of the combined system and its environment. The decoherence irreversibly converts the "averaged" or "environmentally traced-over" density matrix from a pure state to a reduced mixture; it is this that gives the appearance of wave-function collapse. Again, this is called "environmentally induced superselection", or einselection. The advantage of taking the partial trace is that this procedure is indifferent to the environmental basis chosen.

Initially, the density matrix of the combined system can be denoted as

 

where  is the state of the environment.
Then if the transition happens before any interaction takes place between the system and the environment, the environment subsystem has no part and can be traced out, leaving the reduced density matrix for the system:

 

Now the transition probability will be given as

 

Now the case when transition takes place after the interaction of the system with the environment. The combined density matrix will be

 

To get the reduced density matrix of the system, we trace out the environment and employ the decoherence/einselection condition and see that the off-diagonal terms vanish (a result obtained by Erich Joos and H. D. Zeh in 1985):

 

Similarly, the final reduced density matrix after the transition will be

 

The transition probability will then be given as

 

which has no contribution from the interference terms

 

The density-matrix approach has been combined with the Bohmian approach to yield a reduced-trajectory approach, taking into account the system reduced density matrix and the influence of the environment.

Operator-sum representation
Consider a system S and environment (bath) B, which are closed and can be treated quantum-mechanically. Let  and  be the system's and bath's Hilbert spaces respectively. Then the Hamiltonian for the combined system is

 

The time-evolution of the density operator of this closed system is unitary and, as such, is given by

 

If the system and bath are not entangled initially, then we can write . Therefore, the evolution of the system becomes

 

The system–bath interaction Hamiltonian can be written in a general form as

 

This coupling of the system and bath is the cause of decoherence in the system alone. To see this, a partial trace is performed over the bath to give a description of the system alone:

 

 is called the reduced density matrix and gives information about the system only. If the bath is written in terms of its set of orthogonal basis kets, that is, if it has been initially diagonalized, then . Computing the partial trace with respect to this (computational) basis gives

 

where  are defined as the Kraus operators and are represented as (the index  combines indices  and ):

 

This is known as the operator-sum representation (OSR). A condition on the Kraus operators can be obtained by using the fact that ; this then gives

 

This restriction determines whether decoherence will occur or not in the OSR.

Semigroup approach
A more general consideration for the existence of decoherence in a quantum system is given by the master equation, which determines how the density matrix of the system alone evolves in time (see also the Belavkin equation for the evolution under continuous measurement). This uses the Schrödinger picture, where evolution of the state (represented by its density matrix) is considered. The master equation is

 

The Lindblad decohering term is represented as
 

The  are basis operators for the M-dimensional space of bounded operators that act on the system Hilbert space  and are the error generators. The matrix elements  represent the elements of a positive semi-definite Hermitian matrix; they characterize the decohering processes and, as such, are called the noise parameters. The semigroup approach is particularly nice, because it distinguishes between the unitary and decohering (non-unitary) processes, which is not the case with the OSR. Note that when , the dynamical evolution of the system is unitary. The conditions for the evolution of the system density matrix to be described by the master equation are:
 the evolution of the system density matrix is determined by a one-parameter semigroup
 the evolution is "completely positive" (i.e. probabilities are preserved)
 the system and bath density matrices are initially decoupled

Non-unitary modelling examples
Decoherence can be modelled as a non-unitary process by which a system couples with its environment (although the combined system plus environment evolves in a unitary fashion). Thus the dynamics of the system alone, treated in isolation, are non-unitary and, as such, are represented by irreversible transformations acting on the system's Hilbert space . Since the system's dynamics are represented by irreversible representations, then any information present in the quantum system can be lost to the environment or heat bath. Alternatively, the decay of quantum information caused by the coupling of the system to the environment is referred to as decoherence. Thus decoherence is the process by which information of a quantum system is altered by the system's interaction with its environment (which form a closed system), hence creating an entanglement between the system and heat bath (environment). As such, since the system is entangled with its environment in some unknown way, a description of the system by itself cannot be made without also referring to the environment (i.e. without also describing the state of the environment).

Rotational decoherence
Consider a system of N qubits that is coupled to a bath symmetrically. Thus these basis qubits  and  will transform in the following way:

 

This transformation is performed by the rotation operator

 

Since any qubit in this space can be expressed in terms of the basis qubits, then all such qubits will be transformed under this rotation. Consider the th qubit in a pure state  where . Before application of the rotation this state is:

.

This state will decohere, since it is not ‘encoded’ with (dependent upon) the dephasing factor . This can be seen by examining the density matrix averaged over the random phase :

 ,

where  is a probability measure of the random phase, . Although not entirely necessary, let us assume for simplicity that this is given by the Gaussian distribution, i.e. , where  represents the spread of the random phase. Then the density matrix computed as above is

.

Observe that the off-diagonal elements—the coherence terms—decay as the spread of the random phase, increases over time (which is a realistic expectation). Thus the density matrices for each qubit of the system become indistinguishable over time. This means that no measurement can distinguish between the qubits, thus creating decoherence between the various qubit states. This is why this type of decoherence process is called collective dephasing, because the mutual phases between all qubits of the N-qubit system are destroyed.

Depolarizing
Depolarizing is a non-unitary transformation on a quantum system which maps pure states to mixed states. This is a non-unitary process because any transformation that reverses this process will map states out of their respective Hilbert space thus not preserving positivity (i.e. the original probabilities are mapped to negative probabilities, which is not allowed). The 2-dimensional case of such a transformation would consist of mapping pure states on the surface of the Bloch sphere to mixed states within the Bloch sphere. This would contract the Bloch sphere by some finite amount and the reverse process would expand the Bloch sphere, which cannot happen.

Dissipation

Dissipation is a decohering process by which the populations of quantum states are changed due to entanglement with a bath. An example of this would be a quantum system that can exchange its energy with a bath through the interaction Hamiltonian. If the system is not in its ground state and the bath is at a temperature lower than that of the system's, then the system will give off energy to the bath, and thus higher-energy eigenstates of the system Hamiltonian will decohere to the ground state after cooling and, as such, will all be non-degenerate. Since the states are no longer degenerate, they are not distinguishable, and thus this process is irreversible (non-unitary).

Timescales
Decoherence represents an extremely fast process for macroscopic objects, since these are interacting with many microscopic objects, with an enormous number of degrees of freedom in their natural environment. The process is needed if we are to understand why we tend not to observe quantum behavior in everyday macroscopic objects and why we do see classical fields emerge from the properties of the interaction between matter and radiation for large amounts of matter. The time taken for off-diagonal components of the density matrix to effectively vanish is called the decoherence time. It is typically extremely short for everyday, macroscale processes. A modern basis-independent definition of the decoherence time relies on the short-time behavior of the fidelity between the initial and the time-dependent state or, equivalently, the decay of the purity.

Mathematical details
Assume for the moment that the system in question consists of a subsystem A being studied and the "environment" , and the total Hilbert space is the tensor product of a Hilbert space  describing A and a Hilbert space  describing , that is,

The point is, the interaction with the environment is for all practical purposes unavoidable (e.g. even a single excited atom in a vacuum would emit a photon, which would then go off). Let's say this interaction is described by a unitary transformation U acting upon .

 

(This could be a "continuously indexed basis" or a mixture of continuous and discrete indexes, in which case we would have to use a rigged Hilbert space and be more careful about what we mean by orthonormal, but that's an inessential detail for expository purposes.) Then, we can expand

 

and

 

uniquely as

 

and

 

respectively. One thing to realize is that the environment contains a huge number of degrees of freedom, a good number of them interacting with each other all the time. This makes the following assumption reasonable in a handwaving way, which can be shown to be true in some simple toy models.

This often turns out to be true (as a reasonable conjecture) in the position basis because how A interacts with the environment would often depend critically upon the position of the objects in A. Then, if we take the partial trace over the environment, we would find the density state is approximately described by

that is, we have a diagonal mixed state, there is no constructive or destructive interference, and the "probabilities" add up classically. The time it takes for U(t) (the unitary operator as a function of time) to display the decoherence property is called the decoherence time.

Experimental observations

Quantitative measurement
The decoherence rate depends on a number of factors, including temperature or uncertainty in position, and many experiments have tried to measure it depending on the external environment.

The process of a quantum superposition gradually obliterated by decoherence was quantitatively measured for the first time by Serge Haroche and his co-workers at the École Normale Supérieure in Paris in 1996. Their approach involved sending individual rubidium atoms, each in a superposition of two states, through a microwave-filled cavity. The two quantum states both cause shifts in the phase of the microwave field, but by different amounts, so that the field itself is also put into a superposition of two states. Due to photon scattering on cavity-mirror imperfection, the cavity field loses phase coherence to the environment.

Haroche and his colleagues measured the resulting decoherence via correlations between the states of pairs of atoms sent through the cavity with various time delays between the atoms.

Reducing environmental decoherence
In July 2011, researchers from University of British Columbia and University of California, Santa Barbara were able to reduce environmental decoherence rate "to levels far below the threshold necessary for quantum information processing" by applying high magnetic fields in their experiment.

In August 2020 scientists reported that ionizing radiation from environmental radioactive materials and cosmic rays may substantially limit the coherence times of qubits if they aren't shielded adequately which may be critical for realizing fault-tolerant superconducting quantum computers in the future.

Criticism
Criticism of the adequacy of decoherence theory to solve the measurement problem has been expressed by Anthony Leggett.

In interpretations of quantum mechanics
Before an understanding of decoherence was developed, the Copenhagen interpretation of quantum mechanics treated wave-function collapse as a fundamental, a priori process. Decoherence as a possible explanatory mechanism for the appearance of wave function collapse was first developed by David Bohm in 1952, who applied it to Louis DeBroglie's pilot-wave theory, producing Bohmian mechanics, the first successful hidden-variables interpretation of quantum mechanics. Decoherence was then used by Hugh Everett in 1957 to form the core of his many-worlds interpretation. However, decoherence was largely ignored for many years (with the exception of Zeh's work), and not until the 1980s did decoherent-based explanations of the appearance of wave-function collapse become popular, with the greater acceptance of the use of reduced density matrices. The range of decoherent interpretations have subsequently been extended around the idea, such as consistent histories. Some versions of the Copenhagen interpretation have been modified to include decoherence.

Decoherence does not claim to provide a mechanism for some actual wave-function collapse; rather it puts forth a reasonable framework for the appearance of wave-function collapse. The quantum nature of the system is simply "leaked" into the environment so that a total superposition of the wave function still exists, but exists – at least for all practical purposes — beyond the realm of measurement. By definition, the claim that a merged but unmeasurable wave function still exists cannot be proven experimentally. Decoherence is needed to understand why a quantum system begins to obey classical probability rules after interacting with its environment (due to the suppression of the interference terms when applying Born's probability rules to the system).

See also

 Dephasing
 Dephasing rate SP formula
 Einselection
 Ghirardi–Rimini–Weber theory
 H. Dieter Zeh
 Interpretations of quantum mechanics
 Objective-collapse theory
 Partial trace
 Photon polarization
 Quantum coherence
 Quantum Darwinism
 Quantum entanglement
 Quantum superposition
 Quantum Zeno effect

References

Further reading
 
 
 
 Zurek, Wojciech H. (2003). "Decoherence and the transition from quantum to classical – REVISITED",  (An updated version of PHYSICS TODAY, 44:36–44 (1991) article)
 
 J. J. Halliwell, J. Perez-Mercader, Wojciech H. Zurek, eds, The Physical Origins of Time Asymmetry, Part 3: Decoherence, 
 Berthold-Georg Englert, Marlan O. Scully & Herbert Walther, Quantum Optical Tests of Complementarity, Nature, Vol 351, pp 111–116 (9 May 1991) and (same authors) The Duality in Matter and Light Scientific American, pg 56–61, (December 1994).  Demonstrates that complementarity is enforced, and quantum interference effects destroyed, by irreversible object-apparatus correlations, and not, as was previously popularly believed, by Heisenberg's uncertainty principle itself.
 Mario Castagnino, Sebastian Fortin, Roberto Laura and Olimpia Lombardi, A general theoretical framework for decoherence in open and closed systems, Classical and Quantum Gravity, 25, pp. 154002–154013, (2008). A general theoretical framework for decoherence is proposed, which encompasses formalisms originally devised to deal just with open or closed systems.

External links
 
 
  Quantum Bug : Qubits might spontaneously decay in seconds Scientific American (October 2005)

Decoherence
Articles containing video clips
1970 introductions